Kalidou Sidibé (born 28 January 1999) is a French professional footballer who plays as a midfielder for  club Quevilly-Rouen.

Career
Sidibé was a youth product of various clubs in Paris, before moving to Toulouse in 2017. He made his professional debut with Toulouse in a 1–0 Coupe de la Ligue loss to Lorient on 31 October 2018.

On 23 August 2021, Sidibé moved on a season-long loan to Quevilly-Rouen. On 13 August 2022, he returned to Quevilly-Rouen on a two-year contract.

Personal life
Born in France, Sidibé is of Malian descent.

References

External links
 
 
 TFC Profile

Living people
1998 births
Sportspeople from Montreuil, Seine-Saint-Denis
Association football midfielders
French footballers
Black French sportspeople
French sportspeople of Malian descent
Paris Saint-Germain F.C. players
Paris FC players
Toulouse FC players
LB Châteauroux players
US Quevilly-Rouen Métropole players
Ligue 1 players
Ligue 2 players
Championnat National 3 players
Footballers from Seine-Saint-Denis